The Games of the Small States of Europe records in athletics set by athletes who are representing one of the eight European small states at the Games of the Small States of Europe. Records have been updated after the last Games, held in Reykjavík in 2015.

Men's records

Women's records

References

External links
GSSE records (as of 2009)

Games of the Small States of Europe
Athletics
Games of the Small States of Europe